Ponta Verde is a town in the northwestern part of the island of Fogo, Cape Verde. In 2010 its population was 1,072. It is situated 11 km northeast of the island capital São Filipe.

See also
List of cities and towns in Cape Verde

References

Geography of Fogo, Cape Verde
São Filipe, Cape Verde
Towns in Cape Verde